{{DISPLAYTITLE:C11H16N2}}
The molecular formula C11H16N2 (molar mass: 176.263 g/mol) may refer to:

 Benzylpiperazine (BZP)
 ortho-Methylphenylpiperazine (oMPP)

Molecular formulas